The following is a list of Israeli flying aces in Arab-Israeli wars.

List of aces

See also
 History of the Israeli Air Force
 List of Egyptian flying aces
 List of Syrian flying aces

References

Footnotes

Bibliography

Arab–Israeli conflict
Arab-Israeli
Israeli
Israeli Air Force
 
Flying aces
Flying aces